The statue of Alexander von Humboldt is installed in Mexico City's Alameda Central, in Mexico. The base has the inscription, "La Nación Mexicana a Alejandro de Humboldt – Benemerito de la Patria 1799–1999". The statue was built after Humboldt visited Mexico.

References

External links

 
 

Alameda Central
Alexander von Humboldt
Monuments and memorials in Mexico City
Outdoor sculptures in Mexico City
Sculptures of men in Mexico
Statues in Mexico City